NBL1 South is a semi-professional basketball league in South East Australia, comprising both a men's and women's competition.

Champions

Results by Year

Results by teams

See also 

 NBL1
 NBL1 South

References 

champions
NBL1 South champions
NBL1
NBL1